Heppner is an extinct town in Fall River County, in the U.S. state of South Dakota. The GNIS classifies it as a populated place.

History
Heppner was laid out in 1914, and named in honor of Charles Heppner, who was instrumental in securing the post office for the town. A post office was established at Heppner in 1914, and remained in operation until 1952.

References

Ghost towns in South Dakota
Geography of Fall River County, South Dakota